Henry Montgomery may refer to:

Henry Montgomery (bishop) (1847–1932), father of the 1st Viscount Montgomery of Alamein
Henry Montgomery (Liberal politician) (1863–1951), Member of Parliament for Bridgwater, 1906–1910
Henry Montgomery (American politician) (1858–1917), South Dakota State Representative, 1903–1906
Sir Henry Conyngham Montgomery, (1765–1830), Member of Parliament for Mitchell, 1807; Donegal, 1808–1812; and Yarmouth, 1812–1816
 Robert Montgomery (actor) (1904–1981), born Henry Montgomery, Jr
 Henry Montgomery, the plaintiff in the 2015 U.S. Supreme Court case of Montgomery v. Louisiana